FOXM1-regulated, gastric cancer associated is a long non-coding RNA that in humans is encoded by the FRGCA gene.

References

Further reading